Female Preacher is the debut, and to date the only album recorded by Tonya Davis, a US rapper better known as Overweight Pooch, which was released in 1991 on A&M Records. Although the record indicated that Pooch had some potential, her album didn't go far commercially.

Three songs were issued on single including a promo release, "Hip House Party", initially also promoted on Jam Harder: The A&M Underground Dance Compilation in 1990. The compilation scored at number sixty-three on the U.S. R&B/Hip-Hop Albums chart and at number one-hundred-thirty-one on the Top 200 Billboard Albums. "Ace Is a Spade", originally titled as "Ace a Spade", contained samples of "New Day" and the James Brown's hit "Soul Power" The final single from the set "I Like It", it featured background vocals by CeCe Peniston who also contributed to the set with additional two tracks that she also co-wrote; "Kickin' Da Blues" and "Female Preacher". The single itself reached number sixteen in the U.S. Billboard Hot Dance/Music Club Play chart, and peaked at number fifty-eight on the UK Singles Chart in January 1992.

Track listing

Releases
US, 75021 5349 (LP, CD, MC)
Germany, 395 349 (CD)

Credits and personnel

 Tonya Davis - lead vocal, writer, co-producer
 CeCe Peniston - back vocal, co-writer
 Felipe Delgado - writer, producer, engineer, mix, cuts/scratches
 Andrew Smith - writer, producer
 T. Smith - writer
 James Brown - writer
 L. Collins - writer
 T-Wax - writer
 Elbert Lee Linnear - writer
 J.C. Styles - writer
 Lionel Richie - writer
 Walter Orange - writer
 Thomas McClary - writer
 Ronald La Pread - writer
 Milan Williams - writer
 William King - writer
 Kellan Fluckiger - additional producer, engineer, trumpet
 Manny Lehman - executive producer, additional producer, mix
 Ramone Forrestor - additional producer
 Mark Mazzetti - executive producer
 DJ Mark Mello - cuts/scratches
 Gail "Sky" King - mix
 Clark Kent - mix
 Jack Benson - engineer
 Eric Eden - overdubs
 Brian Gardner - mastering
 Kenne "Pee" Perkins - management
 Len Peltier - art direction
 Boomin' WD - design
 John Casado - photography
 The Wizard Electric, Glendale, Arizona - studio
 Electric Lady Studios, New York City - mix
 Unique Recording Studios, NYC - mix
 Cherokee Studios, Hollywood, CA - mix
 Bernie Grundman Mastering - mastering

Charts

Singles

References 

General

Specific

External links

1991 debut albums
A&M Records albums
CeCe Peniston albums